Babylon Town Hall, also known as Town of Babylon Old Town Hall, is a historic town hall located at Babylon in Suffolk County, New York. It was built in 1917 and is a -story Classical Revival style building with a low hipped roof.  It is rectangular in shape, approximately 58 feet long and 54 feet wide.  It features a cupola at the center of the roof and a large 2-story portico with four Doric order columns.  It housed town offices until 1958, and housed district courts until 1979, when it was sold.   Old Town Hall was purchased back by the town in June 2004 and rededicated on Sunday, October 24, 2004.

It was added to the National Register of Historic Places in 2005. A historical marker was erected by the Town of Babylon in 1986.

References

City and town halls on the National Register of Historic Places in New York (state)
Neoclassical architecture in New York (state)
National Register of Historic Places in Babylon (town), New York
Buildings and structures in Suffolk County, New York
Government buildings completed in 1917
1917 establishments in New York (state)